Brachypeza is a genus of flies belonging to the family Mycetophilidae.

The species of this genus are found in Europe and Northern America.

Species:
 Brachypeza abita Scudder, 1877 
 Brachypeza altaica Zaitzev, 1987

References

Mycetophilidae